Heilwig is a German female given name. It is related to the names Helwig and Hillevi and to the surname Halbig.

Notable people
Notable people with this given name include:
 Heilwig Jacob (born 1942), German sprinter
 Heilwig of Lippe (c. 1200–c. 1250), German noblewoman

See also
 Halbig
 Helwig
 Hellwig
 Helvig (disambiguation)

References